Wrecked may refer to:

Films
 Wrecked (film), a 2011 thriller directed by Michael Greenspan
 Scenic Route (film) or Wrecked, a 2013 psychological thriller directed by Kevin and Michael Goetz

TV
 "Wrecked" (Buffy the Vampire Slayer), a 2001 television episode
 Wrecked (UK TV series), a 2007 MTV comedy series
 Wrecked (American TV series), a 2016 American comedy television series on TBS
 Wrecked: Life in the Crash Lane, a Speed Channel reality series

Music

Albums
 Wrecked (album), a 1996 album released by Raymond Watts.

Songs
 "Wrecked" (song), a song by Imagine Dragons from their 2021 album, Mercury – Act 1

Others

 Wrecked: Revenge Revisited, a video game

See also

 Wreck (disambiguation)
 Wrecker (disambiguation)
 Wrecks, one-man play